Scarfe is the surname of:

 Alan Scarfe (born 1946), Canadian actor, stage director and author
 Alan Scarfe (bishop) (born 1950), English-born US Episcopal Church bishop
 David Scarfe (born 1960), Australian cyclist
 Francis Scarfe (1911–1986), English poet, critic and novelist
 George Scarfe (c. 1826–1903), merchant in South Australia
 Gerald Scarfe (born 1936), English cartoonist and illustrator
 Warren Scarfe (1936–1964), Australian cyclist
 Wendy Scarfe (born 1933), Australian novelist, biographer and poet

See also 
 6532 Scarfe, main-belt asteroid named after Canadian astronomer Colin Scarfe
 Scarf (disambiguation), which lists people with the surname Scarf